Peter Michael Weigand (July 26, 1941 – March 18, 2011) was an American sprint canoer who competed in the late 1960s. He was eliminated in the repechage round of K-2 1000 m event at the 1968 Summer Olympics in Mexico City.

References
Peter Weigand's profile at Sports Reference.com
Peter Weigand's obituary

1941 births
2011 deaths
American male canoeists
Canoeists at the 1968 Summer Olympics
Olympic canoeists of the United States